My Broadcasting Corporation is a Canadian broadcasting company founded in 2004 by Jon Pole and Andrew Dickson. Based in Renfrew, Ontario, the company operates a number of radio stations in small to medium sized markets in Ontario. All of its stations offer local news, weather, sports and community events seven days a week.

History
The roots of My Broadcasting Corporation (MBC) date back to Ottawa Valley Radio in the mid-1980s (CKOA Arnprior and CKOB Renfrew). Those stations were owned by Jamie Pole, the father of current MBC co-owner and President Jon Pole. Jon's business partner and Executive VP of MBC, Andrew Dickson, was an announcer at CKOB in the late '70's and then filled in as morning announcer when Jamie Pole owned the station. The original morning man for myFM, Bob Rose (deceased) was the morning man for Ottawa Valley Radio for many years. Several former Ottawa Valley Radio staffers have returned to myFM and continue to be part of the team, including Rob Mise and Peter DeWolf (deceased).

In 2006, the company applied for a second station in the Pembroke market, to play classic rock, although its application was denied. Similarly, the company's application to launch a new station in St. Thomas was denied in 2009.

In early 2009, the company also announced a tentative deal to acquire CIYN-FM in Kincardine, which received CRTC approval on May 13, 2009. The company also received CRTC approval to launch a new station in Brighton on May 15, 2009.

On August 2, 2013, My Broadcasting submitted applications to operate new FM radio stations in Arnprior and Carleton Place, and acquiring Peterborough station CJMB-FM outright from McNabb Broadcasting. CJMB, if the application is approved, would be the company's first station in one of Ontario's larger radio markets; as well, the company planned to operate CJMB as a sports radio station which would be the company's first expansion outside of its conventional "my FM" branding and adult contemporary formatting. The CRTC approved the acquisition of CJMB-FM on December 11, 2013.

On December 9, 2013, My Broadcasting submitted an application to operate a new FM radio station at Orangeville, proposed to operate at 101.5 MHz, the new station received approval on July 18, 2014. My Broadcasting previously submitted an application to operate the new station there in 2012 but the application was soon withdrawn.

On an unknown date, My Broadcasting Corporation submitted an application to the CRTC to broadcast on 107.7 FM (later 97.5) in Carleton Place, this application would be denied by the CRTC on April 2, 2014. Also on that date, the CRTC approved the new station in Arnprior, which will replace CHMY-FM-1 at 107.7.

In June 2015, My Broadcasting announced a deal to purchase Pineridge Broadcasting, the owner of CHUC-FM and CKSG-FM in Cobourg and CJWV-FM in Peterborough.

On July 11, 2016, My Broadcasting submitted an application to operate a new FM radio station at 93.7 MHz in Georgina.

On December 7, 2016, My Broadcasting submitted an application to operate a new FM radio station at 99.7 MHz in Simcoe. This application received CRTC approval on June 9, 2017

On April 13, 2017, My Broadcasting submitted an application to operate a new FM radio station in Georgina, as part of the CRTC's call applications. This application is pending CRTC approval.

On February 26, 2021, My Broadcasting announced a deal to acquire CHLK-FM in Perth.

On June 25, 2021, the CRTC approved a sale of CIMA-FM Alliston, CJML-FM Milton and CKMO-FM Orangeville by My Broadcasting to Local Radio Lab, led by former Haliburton Broadcasting Group owner Christopher Grossman. On June 30, 2021, the CRTC approved a sale of CIYN-FM Kincardine, CIYN-FM-1 Goderich and CIYN-FM-2 Port Elgin to Lakeside Radio Broadcasting Corp., owned by Greg Hetherington and Ray Stanton.

In August 2022, the company announced a deal to acquire CIXL-FM and CKYY-FM in Welland from Wellport Broadcasting.

In December 2022, Pole and Dickson agreed to acquire Border International Broadcasting—the U.S.-based licensee of WLYK in Cape Vincent, New York, which is presently operated by Rogers Media as a station serving Kingston—for $325,000.

Stations

Former stations

Notes

1 Purchase approved by the CRTC in May 2009; transaction completed November 30, 2009.

References

External links
 My Broadcasting Corporation - www.mybroadcastingcorp.com - Official website 
 My Broadcasting Corporation - Historical information from broadcasting-history.ca - Canadian Communications Foundation

Radio broadcasting companies of Canada
Companies based in Ontario
Privately held companies of Canada